Alan Frederick Fletcher (28 October 1917 – 1984) was an English professional footballer. He played in the Football League for Bournemouth and Crewe Alexandra.

Fletcher joined Blackpool in January 1937, later joining Port Vale without appearing for either side. He moved to Bournemouth, playing twelve times during the 1938–39 season. He joined Bristol Rovers in 1939, playing all three games before World War II stopped League football in England.

He joined Crewe Alexandra in September 1947, but made just one appearance before joining Mossley as player-coach. He left Mossley to become player-coach with Irish side Sligo Rovers at the start of the 1949–50 season. He returned to Mossley as player-manager in August 1950. Mossley struggled in the Cheshire League under Fletcher and he was sacked in May 1951.

Career statistics
Source:

References

1917 births
1984 deaths
People from Clitheroe
English footballers
Association football forwards
Blackpool F.C. players
Port Vale F.C. players
AFC Bournemouth players
Bristol Rovers F.C. players
Crewe Alexandra F.C. players
Mossley A.F.C. players
English expatriate footballers
Expatriate association footballers in the Republic of Ireland
Sligo Rovers F.C. players
English Football League players
League of Ireland players
Association football coaches
Association football player-managers
English football managers
English expatriate football managers
Expatriate football managers in the Republic of Ireland
Sligo Rovers F.C. managers
Mossley A.F.C. managers
League of Ireland managers